Edina Kulcsár (born 23 December 1990) is a Hungarian model and beauty queen. She was crowned as Miss World Hungary 2014 and represented the country at Miss World 2014 where she was first runner-up.

Pageantry

Miss World Hungary 2014
She was crowned as Miss World Hungary 2014, representing Budapest.

Miss World 2014
She competed at Miss World 2014 in London on 14 December 2014. She was first runner-up.

References

1990 births
Living people
Hungarian beauty pageant winners
Miss World 2014 delegates
Hungarian female models
Models from Budapest